The European Athletics Indoor Cup was a biennial (formerly annual) athletics sporting event that first took place in 2003 in Leipzig, Germany, where it was also organized the following year. The 3rd edition was held in 2006, in order to be held every two years to alternate with the European Indoor Championships in Athletics, but had its final edition in 2008. The event was organized by the European Athletic Association (EAA).

The purpose of the competition was to provide an international team competition at an indoor track and field event.

List of competitions

References

External links
The 4th European Athletics Indoor Cup official site
European Athletics official site

 
Indoor
Defunct athletics competitions
Recurring sporting events established in 2003
Team combination track and field competitions
Indoor track and field competitions
European international sports competitions
Biennial athletics competitions
2003 establishments in Europe
2008 disestablishments in Europe
Recurring sporting events disestablished in 2008